Scudderia fasciata, known generally as the treetop bush katydid or black-striped katydid, is a species of phaneropterine katydid in the family Tettigoniidae. It is found in North America.

References

Scudderia
Articles created by Qbugbot
Insects described in 1894